Alinari is an Italian surname that may refer to
Giuseppe, Leopoldo and Romualdo Alinari, Italian photographers
Fratelli Alinari, Italian photography company founded by Alinari brothers
Luca Alinari (1943–2019), Italian painter
Vittorio Alinari (1859–1932), Italian photographer, son of Leopoldo